Founded in 1965, Giorno Poetry Systems was an American artist collective, record label, and non-profit organisation founded by poet and performance artist John Giorno with the direct aim to connect poetry and related art forms to a larger audience using innovative ideas, such as communication technology, audiovisual materials and techniques.

History
In the early 1960s, young New York City-born poet John Giorno became acquainted with artists who were at the threshold of their successful careers, most notably Andy Warhol, Roy Lichtenstein, Merce Cunningham and John Cage. Warhol would have an important impact on Giorno, as the latter became the protagonist of Warhol's film Sleep (1964), which depicts Giorno sleeping for five hours, and the unreleased Handjob, following Giorno's face while masturbating.

Giorno believed that, at this level, poetry was running behind. Evidently, these artists in music and painting etc., would act whenever an idea arose in their minds, while the availability and progression of poetry was limited to books and magazines, let alone multimedia or performance.

Analogue to then active Pop-Art ideas, Giorno wanted to change poetry's situation by communicating to his audiences through everyday means such as telephone, television, records and so on. After all, phonographs and radio were a perfect terrain for people to listen, as Giorno called it poetry’s venue. Furthermore, these ways would offer Giorno's ideas a wide open space to explore, to reach a broad audience not limited anymore to that of the poetry magazines.

From 1965 on, Giorno would explore tape and phonograph recording, along with colleagues William S. Burroughs and Brion Gysin, using a variety of tape experiments such as loops and cut techniques Giorno was introduced to Bob Moog, who was working on his Moog synthesizer, on the verge of its fame.

The GPS label released albums regularly until the late 1980s. Many of these albums included early recordings by later-prominent performers such as Laurie Anderson and Philip Glass as well as unique performances by Frank Zappa, Diamanda Galás, Allen Ginsberg, John Cage, and Brion Gysin, as well as Giorno and Burroughs. In the 1990s, Giorno Poetry Systems released a box set collecting its recordings of William S. Burroughs.

Concept

Dial-a-Poem

After having a conversation on the phone with Burroughs in 1968, Giorno initiated the Dial-a-Poem Poets concept, which he claimed would later influence the creation of information services creation over the telephone, such as sports and stock market. Fifteen phone lines were connected with individual answering machines: people would call GPS and listen to a poem they were offered from fragments of various live recordings. Dial-a-Poem, from 1969 on, was very successful, with 9 a.m. to 5 p.m. and 8.30 p.m. to 11.30 p.m. peaks. GPS used a variety of social issues at the time, what with the sexual revolution and the Vietnam War, which would create appeal as well as shock from the reactive community.

Discography

Albums
The Dial-a-Poem Poets, GPS 001-002, 1972 
The Dial-a-Poem Poets: Disconnected, GPS 003-004, 1974 
Biting Off the Tongue of a Corpse, GPS 005, 1975
William S. Burroughs / John Giorno, GPS 006-007, 1975
The Dial-a-Poem Poets: Totally Corrupt, GPS 008-009, 1976
John Giorno & Anne Waldman: a KulchurSelection, GPS 010-011, 1977
Big Ego, GPS 012-013, 1978
The Nova Convention, GPS, GPS 014-015, 1979, with a once-only Frank Zappa performance reading an excerpt from Naked Lunch
The Dial-a-Poem Poets: Sugar, Alcohol & Meat, GPS, GPS GPS 016-017, 1980
John Giorno, William S. Burroughs, Laurie Anderson: You're the Guy I Want to Share My Money With (with multigrooved track) GPS020-021, 022-023, 042, 1981 
Polyphonix 1, GPS 024, 1981
One World Poetry GPS 028-029, 1981 
John Giorno & Glenn Branca: Who You Staring At?, GPS 025, 1982
The Dial-a-Poem Poets: Life Is a Killer, GPS 027, 1982
Lenny Kaye Connection: I've Got a Right, GPS 032, 1984 
The Dial-a-Poem Poets: Better an Old Demon Than a New God, GPS 033, 1984 
Smack My Crack, GPS 038, 1987
Like a Girl, I Want You to Keep Coming, GPS 040, 1989
John Giorno in Florence, 1979/2000 edited by Maurizio Nannucci, Recorthings 2012

Compilations
You're a Hook: The 15-Year Anniversary of Dial-a-Poem (1968-1983), GPS 030, 1984
A Diamond Hidden in the Mouth of a Corpse, GPS 035, 1985
Smack My Crack, GPS 038, 1987
Like a Girl I Want You to Keep Coming, GPS 040, 1989
Cash Cow: The Best of Giorno Poetry Systems, GPS 044, 1993
Selections from The Best of William Burroughs, 1998
The Best of William S. Burroughs from Giorno Poetry Systems, 1998

Video Materials
Giorno Video Pak 1, GVP 1/GPS 031, with Lenny Kaye, William S. Burroughs and John Giorno.
Burroughs, GVP 2/GPS 034, directed by Howard Brookner
Poetry in Motion, GPS 036, a film by Ron Mann
It's Clean, It Just Looks Dirty, GVP 3/GPS 037
Gang of Souls, GVP 4/GPS 039
Old Habits Die Hard, GVP 5/GPS 041

See also
 List of record labels

References

External links
Giorno Poetry Systems at UbuWeb.com - 12 albums available for download in MP3 format.

American record labels
Record labels established in 1965
Alternative rock record labels